The 1992–93 Northern Premier League season was the 25th in the history of the Northern Premier League, a football competition in England. Teams were divided into two divisions; the Premier Division, won by Southport and the First Division, won by Bridlington Town. It was known as the HFS Loans League for sponsorship reasons.

Premier Division 

The Premier Division featured three new teams:

 Barrow relegated from the Football Conference
 Colwyn Bay promoted as champions from Division One
 Winsford United promoted as runners-up from Division One

League table

Results

Division One 

Division One featured four new teams:

 Ashton United promoted as champions of the NWCFL Division One
 Great Harwood Town promoted as runners-up of the NWCFL Division One
 Gretna promoted as champions of the Northern League Division One
 Shepshed Albion relegated from the Premier Division
The Shepshed Charterhouse Renamed to Shepshed Albion before this season.

League table

Promotion and relegation 

In the twenty-fifth season of the Northern Premier League Southport (as champions) were automatically promoted to the Football Conference. Mossley and Goole Town were relegated to the First Division; these three clubs were replaced by relegated Conference side Boston United, First Division winners Bridlington Town and second placed Knowsley United. In the First Division Shepshed Albion and Rossendale United left the League at the end of the season and were replaced by newly admitted Spennymoor United and Bamber Bridge.

Cup Results
Challenge Cup:

Winsford United bt. Warrington Town

President's Cup:

Winsford United bt. Southport

Northern Premier League Shield: Between Champions of NPL Premier Division and Winners of the Presidents Cup.

Southport bt. Winsford United

References

External links 
 Northern Premier League Tables at RSSSF

Northern Premier League seasons
6